The Academy of Art University (AAU or ART U), formerly Academy of Art College and Richard Stephens Academy of Art, is a private for-profit art school in San Francisco, California. It was founded as the Academy of Advertising Art by Richard S. Stephens in 1929. In fall 2020, it had 202 full-time teachers, 621 part-time teaching staff, and 7,805 students; it claims to be the largest privately owned art and design school in the United States. The school is one of the largest property owners in San Francisco, with the main campus located on New Montgomery Street in the South of Market district.

History 

It was founded in 1929 as, Académie of Advertising Art, a school for advertising art, at 215 Kearny Street. The founder, Richard S. Stephens, a painter and editor for Sunset Magazine, led it until 1951 when his son Richard A. Stephens took over, who in 1992 was replaced by his daughter Elisa Stephens. Under her presidency, student numbers increased from around 2000 to 18,000 by 2011, but have since fallen to under 12,000. Forbes estimated the Stephens' family wealth at $800 million in 2015.

The school has been participating in the NY Fashion Week event bi-annually since 2005. Every year, the university hosts a spring show that highlights student work from the school's 75 disciplines.

The university owns and operates the Academy of Art University Automobile Museum with 200 vintage cars, a collection that started in the 1990s.

In 2009, four former admission officers alleged that the school had compensated them based on how many students they could enroll, which is an incentive-based illegal recruitment technique and defrauding of the federal government. The school took in over $1.5 billion in federal aid to be repaid by students since 2006. The former employees became whistleblowers in a federal case, suing the school in U.S. District Court in Oakland in 2009.

In May 2016, the city of San Francisco brought a lawsuit against Academy of Art University after possible violations of city land-use laws, including the unauthorized conversion of rent-controlled housing to academic use. In December 2016, the school was ordered pay the city $20 million in fees, purchasing low-income housing and additional low-income housing for seniors. It failed to meet the terms of the agreement and in January 2020 the agreement was amended, requiring the Academy of Art University to pay $37.6 million to the city to build affordable housing. The Academy of Art settled a $60 million case after the Stephens' family LLC's acquisition and use of real estate in San Francisco for illegal student housing. It had converted 33 of its 40 buildings from residential use to private use which were out of compliance with zoning codes, signage laws or historic preservation rules in San Francisco.

Academics 

The school offers associate, bachelor's and master's degrees in about twenty-five subjects. Some courses are offered online. As of 2015, the school had not published job placement rates since 2006, and was disagreeing with the US Department of Education over whether it is required to do so.

Academy of Art University received regional accreditation from the Western Association of Schools and Colleges (WASC) in 2007.  The WASC does not require schools to disclose job placement figures.  The school is an accredited institutional member of the National Association of Schools of Art and Design. In interior architecture and design, the Bachelor of Fine Arts degree (taught or online) and Master of Fine Arts degree are accredited by the Council for Interior Design Accreditation. The Master of Architecture degree has, since January 1, 2006, been accredited by the National Architectural Accrediting Board while the Bachelor of Architecture program was granted as of January 1, 2015.

According to the National Center for Education Statistics, 45% of students who began their studies in fall 2013 completed a four-year degree within 150% of that time (the "6-year graduation rate"). For online-only students, the 6-year graduation rate was 6% and 3% for part-time students in mid-2015. Approximately 35% of all students were online-only in 2015. In 2016, roughly 7% of students completed a four-year degree within the allotted time.

According to data from the National Center for Education Statistics in 2019, the school's graduation rate for "full-time, first-time" students was 45%. The school has open admissions and an admission acceptance rate of 100%. In 2016, its accreditor expressed concern over low graduation rates; 37% of students who enrolled in 2010 graduated by 2017.

Athletics

The school sports teams, the Urban Knights, compete as members of the Pacific West Conference in 14 sports in NCAA Division II.

In the 2014–2015 season, the men's cross country team had a second-place finish and the women's team had a record fourth-place finish, earned at the Pacific West Conference Championships. Valentin Pepiot, their third NCAA Nationals individual qualifier, was one of the top finishers from the PacWest in the postseason finale. Academy of Art earned a record 10 PacWest postseason honors. For the 2015 indoor and outdoor track and field seasons, they had seven All-American honors and one NCAA individual champion in Jordan Edwards.

Notable alumni

Notable faculty 
Past and present faculty of the school include:

See also 

 List of colleges and universities in California

References

 
Art schools in California
Art schools in San Francisco
Education companies established in 1929
Financial District, San Francisco
Fisherman's Wharf, San Francisco
For-profit universities and colleges in the United States
Schools accredited by the Western Association of Schools and Colleges
Pacific West Conference schools
Film schools in California
Private universities and colleges in California
1929 establishments in California